Al-Salmiya Sporting Club is a Kuwaiti professional football and sports club in Salmiya. They have won the Kuwaiti Premier League four times, most recently in 2000. They were founded in 1964 and the club covers a total area of 94 thousand square metres comprising ten sports: football, volleyball, table tennis, tennis, squash, fencing, judo, taekwondo, karate and athletics.

Stadium

Al-Salmiya plays their home games at Thamir Stadium in Salmiya. The stadium was Opened on 2004. It has a current capacity of 16,105 spectators.

Crests and colours

Crests
The logo of the club is inspired by  location of Salmiya on the map 
of Kuwait, with green representing the land, while the color blue represents the sea.

Colours
Al-Salmiya's home kit is all sky blue shirts and white shorts, while their away kit is all white shirts and sky blue shorts.

Honours

Domestic
VIVA Premier League: 4
Winners: 1980–81, 1994–95, 1997–98, 1999–00
Kuwait Emir Cup: 2
Winners: 1992–93, 2000–01
Kuwait Crown Cup: 2
Winners: 2000–01, 2015–16
Kuwaiti Division One: 1
Winners: 1971–72
Al-Khurafi Cup: 1
Winners: 1999–00

Regional
GCC Champions League:
Runners-up: 1999

Friendly
Brigadiers Cup: 1
Winners: 2012–13

Futsal
Kuwaiti futsal league: 
Winners: 2011–12

Handball
Asian Club League Handball Championship: 5
Runners-up: 1999, 2001

Performance in AFC competitions
 AFC Champions League: 1 appearance
2005: Group stage
 Asian Club Championship: 3 appearances
1996: Second round
1999: First round
2001: Second round
 Asian Cup Winners Cup: 2 appearances
1994: First Round
2002: Withdrew

Players

Current squad

Former players

FIFA World Cup and AFC Asian Cup players

Club chairmen

Former head coaches

References

External links
 Official site

Salmiya
Salmiya
Salmiya
Salmiya
Salmiya